Battered may refer to:

 Batter (cooking)
 Battered (band)
 Battered (album)
 Battered (1978 film), a 1978 TV movie directed by Peter Werner
 Battered (film), a 1989 documentary directed by Lee Grant

See also
Batter (disambiguation)
Battered person syndrome
Battered woman defense